WKWL (1230 AM) is a radio station licensed to serve the community of Florala, Alabama.  The station is owned by Florala Broadcasting Co., Inc.  It airs a classic pop format to the central Florida Panhandle and central southern Alabama.

History
This station received its original construction permit from the Federal Communications Commission on December 18, 1978. The new station was assigned the WKWL call letters by the Federal Communications Commission in 1979.  WKWL received its license to cover from the FCC on May 28, 1982.

Alumni
Former on-air personnel include disc jockey Gary Scott Thomas.

References

External links

KWL
KWL
Radio stations established in 1982
Covington County, Alabama
1982 establishments in Alabama